Ettercap may refer to:
 Ettercap (Dungeons & Dragons), a fictional monster
 Ettercap (software), a network security tool

See also 
 EtherCAT